Milki (Hindi:मिल्की, Urdu:ملکی ) is a Muslim community in the Indian state of Uttar Pradesh. The clan originated in the Awadh region. A few Milki clans were founded in Karachi, Pakistan. Some of them converted from the Hindu Jat and Bhumihar community of Uttar Pradesh and Bihar.

The Milki kept the surnames used in the Hindu Jat community. In Northern India, the community speaks Urdu and its dialects (Awadhi and Khari Boli). In Pakistan, the community speaks Punjabi. Milki, together with the Qidwai, Malik, and Chaudhary, is one of the four subgroups of a community that collectively forms the Jatt Muslims. Jatt Muslims were once a community of substantial landowners in the Awadh region.

Origin 
The Milki get their name from the revenue-free land grants (milk in Persian) their ancestors received during the Delhi Sultanate period as an incentive to settle there. In the Unnao District, they were substantial landowners.

The Milki were appointed clerks and official record keepers. As part of their duties, they learned Turkish and Arabic, economics, administration, and taxation. They became scribes and functionaries under colonial British rule. The Milki have many things in common with the neighbouring Muslim community, the Kayatha Muslims, and the Manihar, with whom they share many customs.

Culture 
The Milki of Unnao District claim to be Siddiqui Shaikhs, while those of Azamgarh and Ballia claim to be of Turkish origin. The Milki practice intermarriage, which also occurs with the Qidwai, Manihar, and Kayastha Muslim communities. The Milki are also found in the districts of Faizabad, Pratapgarh, Barabanki and Allahabad. Some Milki are Sunni, while others are Shia. They speak Urdu, although most also understand Awadhi.

Notables 
 Mohammad Usman, Brigadier in Indian Army
 Mukhtar Ahmad Ansari, freedom fighter, former President of the Indian Nation Congress & Muslim League 
 Afzal Ansari, Indian politician
 Mukhtar Ansari, Indian politician 
 Abbas Ansari, Indian sport shooter 
 Sibakatullah Ansari, Indian politician 
 Hamid Ansari, 14th Vice President of India

References 

Social groups of Pakistan
Muslim communities of Uttar Pradesh
Muslim communities of India
Social groups of Uttar Pradesh
Shaikh clans